Raphaël Thierry (born 1972) is a French visual artist, painter and illustrator. He displays his work on various media such as drawings, paintings, sculptures, performances, installations and develops his artistic practice under multiple identities. Raphael Thierry lives between Paris and Avignon, France.

Biography 

Born in Tunisia in 1972, Thierry grew up in the South of France. He moved to Paris in 1990 where he studied graphic design at the Académie Julian. Graduated with honors from the École Supérieure d'Arts Graphiques Met de Penninghen in 1994 and recipient of the Villa Medici grant in fine art at the French Academy in Rome in 2004, he decided to focus exclusively on his artistic work. He produced numerous exhibitions and performances while developing his artistic practice under multiple identities. He has worked for many years with the writer and philosopher  with which he published in 2004 the book La Medesima Ombra. During his stay at the French Academy in Rome, he met the composer Jérôme Combier, with whom he created several visual performances during the concerts of Vies Silencieuses. In 2008, he created the duo ©® with the French director Christian Volckman (Renaissance), an artistic collaboration source of a series of thematic films and exhibitions named Theflow. In 2010, he produced the paintings and the video for Frank Wedekind's play Lulu – une tragédie monstre directed by Stéphane Braunschweig at the Théâtre national de la Colline.

Under the name of Rapharty, he created and illustrated a collection of books for children, Les Aventures de Superchien (The Superdog Adventures) since 2000.

Education 
 1994 – Gold Dragon – Graphic Design master's degree, ESAG Met de Penninghen – Académie Julian, Paris, France.

Awards 
 2005 – Recipient of the Villa Medici grant and residency in Fine Art, French Academy in Rome, Italy.
 2004 – Prize Met de Penninghen, Award 2004, Paris, France.

Solo exhibitions 

 2021 – From the posterity of the sun - .4rtgallery, L’Isle-sur-la-Sorgue - France.

 2020 – Flayed - Galerie Un lieu une œuvre, Ménerbes - France.

 2018 – From Nature - avec Guillaume Castel, Galerie Ariane C-Y, Paris - France

 2017 – Eyes of war with ©®, War On Screen, Festival international de Cinema, Châlons-en-Champagne - France.

 2017 – Rustles, Galerie Un lieu une œuvre, Ménerbes - France.

 2015 – Upward, Galerie Ariane C-Y, Paris - France.

 2014 – Reach for the Moon with ©®, Waltman Ortega Fine art, Miami - États-Unis.

 2013 –  Backstage with ©®, Le Quai - Forum des arts vivants, Angers - France.

 2012 – Camera Obscura, Galerie Pascal Lainé, Ménerbes - France.

 2011 – Window, Bernard Chauchet Contemporary Art, London, United Kingdom.
 2011 – Holyfood with Christian Volckman, Waltman Ortega Fine Art, Miami, United States.
 2011 – Ein blick in der Büchse, Galerie ALFA project, Paris, France.
 2011 – Holyfood with Christian Volckman, Olivier Waltman, Paris, France.
 2010 – Caverne, Campredon Centre d'art – hors les murs, L'Isle-sur-la-Sorgue, France.
 2010 – Ardet In Hostem, Musée de Campredon, Centre d'art, L'Isle-sur-la-Sorgue, France.
 2010 – Theflow Food with the French director Christian Volckman, La Passerelle, Fontevraud Abbey, France.
 2010 – Amor Fati, La Maison sur la Sorgue, Galerie Annie Lagier, L'Isle-sur-la-Sorgue, France.
 2009 – Variations, Thirteen Langton Street Gallery, London, United Kingdom.
 2009 – Theflow Hunt with the French director Christian Volckman, One Shot Gallery, Paris, France.
 2007 – Fields of Dust, Espace Carte blanche Gallery, Paris, France.
 2007 – Identita # 1, Art Container Gallery, Rome, Italy.
 2006 – Fra i tuoi colori le ombre, Royaumont Abbey, France.
 2006 – Visions in dust, Atelier del Bosco, Villa Medici, Rome, Italy, curated by Federico Nicolao, exhibited books : Etudes and La Medesima Ombra.

Group exhibitions 
 2011 – Art London, Bernard Chauchet Contemporary Art Gallery, Chelsea, London, United Kingdom.
 2011 – Drawing Now Paris, Galerie ALFA, Paris, France.
 2011 – Art Chicago, Galerie Olivier Waltman, Chicago, United States.
 2010 – Art Paris, Galerie Olivier Waltman, Paris, France.
 2010 – Art Miami, Waltman Ortega Fine Art Gallery, Miami, United States.
 2010 – Art London, Bernard Chauchet Contemporary Art Gallery, Chelsea, London, United Kingdom.
 2010 – Blitz, Alfa Gallery, Paris, France.
 2009 – Art London, Bernard Chauchet Contemporary Art Gallery, Chelsea, London, United Kingdom.
 2008 – Art London, Thirteen Langton Street Gallery, Chelsea, London, United Kingdom.
 2007 – Art London, Thirteen Langton Street Gallery, Chelsea, London, United Kingdom.
 2006 – The landscape of the mediterranean, with Vincent Bioulés, Antoine De La Boulaye and Pierre Buraglio, Thirteen Langton Street Gallery, Chelsea, London, United Kingdom.
 2005 – À la Surface – Notte Bianca, with Mirjam Fruttiger and Jérôme Combier, Grandes Galeries, Villa Medici, Rome, Italy.
 2003 – Parcours de l'Art, Saint-Louis Cloister, Avignon-France

Performances 

 2011 – Reflexions with Mara Dobrescu and Ràzvan Popovici, Sonoro – 6th, Bucharest, Romania.
 2010 – Traces with Sylvain Lemêtre and Jérôme Combier, Nuit des Musées, L'Isle-sur-la-Sorgue, France.
 2009 – Vies silencieuses, Bludenzer Tage zeitgemäßer Musik (contemporary music festival), Bludenz, Austria.
 2009 – Dust Visions, Thirteen Langton Street, London, United Kingdom.
 2008 – Vies silencieuses, Archipel Music Festival, Geneva, Switzerland.
 2007 – Blank Pages, Espace Carte Blanche Gallery, Paris, France.
 2007 – Identita # 1, Art Container Gallery, Rome, Italy
 2006 – Vies silencieuses, Royaumont Music Festival, Royaumont Abbey, France.
 2005 – Silent lifes – Vies silencieuses, Why Note Music Festival, Dijon, France, with the French composer Jérôme Combier.
 2005 – À la surface, Notte Bianca, Grandes Galeries, Villa Medici, Rome, Italy.

Publications 
 2010 – Corps, Sillages Éditions, Vaucluse, France
 2008 – Épreuves du Mystère, Édition Éreme, Paris, France
 2007 – Etudes I and Etudes II, with the writer Federico Nicolao
 2005 – Version Magazine : Coloring Book with Mircea Cantor
 2004 – La Medesima Ombra, Éditions Io, Paris, France, with the writer Federico Nicolao.
 2003 – Exercice de style, in Chorus n° 1, Genoa, Italy.
 2003 – Aube in Pensée art contemporain, Barcelona, Spain.
 2001 – Mistral,Polaire, Ici et là  and Joyeux Noël, Les aventures de Superchien, Magnard jeunesse, Paris, France.
 2001 – Air de printemps, Parfum d'automne, Ami d'hiver  and Soleil d'été, Les aventures de Superchien, Magnard jeunesse, Paris, France.
 2000 – Solitude, Pleine Lune, Déluge , Mirage,  De passage and Papillon Vert, Les aventures de Superchien, Magnard jeunesse, Paris, France.

Press 
 2010 – "Blitz" in Artpress no. 371, France.
 2008 – Festival Archipel in Tribune de Genève, Geneva, Switzerland.
 2007 – "Raphaël Thierry, Fields of Dust" in Paris Art, France.
 2007 – "Identita" in Exhibart, Italy.
 2007 – "Il libro d'artista, un oggetto del futuro" in Domus, no. 895, Italy.
 2006 – "Nelle stanze dei giovani talenti Che sognano in grande", La repubblica delle donne, no. 496, Italy.
 2005 – "La Villa Médicis, un théâtre où tout reste à inventer", in Point de vue magazine, no. 2991, France.

Reference List

20th-century French painters
20th-century French male artists
French male painters
21st-century French painters
21st-century French male artists
1972 births
Living people